The African American Museum of Iowa (AAMI), nestled along the Cedar River near downtown Cedar Rapids, Iowa, United States, has been carrying out its mission “To preserve, publicize, and educate the public on the African American heritage and culture of Iowa” since its incorporation as a 501(c)(3) organization in 1994. It has become the leading educational resource on African American history in Iowa and has two on-site exhibits: a permanent exhibit called Endless Possibilities, and the 2017 temporary exhibit – If Objects Could Talk. Additionally, the AAMI has several "traveling exhibits" that are available free of charge for use by schools, libraries, businesses, etc.

In 2011, the AAMI served over 52,000 people, offering tours, educational programming for all ages, special events, a summer camp, and much more across the state of Iowa.

History
The African American Museum was started in 1994 by a small group from the Mount Zion Missionary Baptist Church in Cedar Rapids, with the goal of preserving the heritage of African Americans in Iowa in celebration of Black History Month. That year, the African American Heritage Foundation, Inc. was chartered in Iowa as a 501(c)(3) non-profit organization.

Four years later, in 1998, the Foundation hired its first full-time employee, Joseph McGill, who served as the Executive Director. In 2000, a temporary museum opened in Westdale Mall in Cedar Rapids, and in April 2002, construction began on a new 17,000 square foot, state-of-the-art facility along the Cedar River.

In May 2003, Thomas Moore was named interim Executive Director for the AAMI; the interim was dropped in November. The Grand Opening of the AAMI was on September 19, 2003 and highlighted the Exhibition|permanent exhibit Doorways: A History of African Americans in Iowa.

The following year brought the creation of an endowment fund for the museum, as well as the opening of the new Africa section of the permanent exhibit. Visitors started in West Africa, where they passed through the “Door of No Return” and entered a slave ship to experience the famous Middle Passage from Africa to the United States.

In 2005, the 12th Ave. bridge near the AAMI was renamed the Dr. Martin Luther King Jr. Memorial Bridge, and a public art piece, Trumpet, was unveiled on the museum grounds near the Cedar River Trail.

Museum chapters were established in eight communities across Iowa in 2006, and in 2007 the AAMI received a grant from the Institute of Museum and Library Services (IMLS) to hire and train two staff members to coordinate the chapter program. Later that same year, the AAMI received a second grant from the IMLS to conduct a statewide oral history project entitled Adult Voices–Children’s Eyes: Iowa's African American Oral History Project. This innovative and ongoing project trained youth groups across Iowa to conduct oral histories in their communities. These sessions recorded important events and sparked a passion for history among African American youth.

The following year, the AAMI was devastated by the Iowa flood of 2008. The first floor of the Museum, home to the education and collection staff as well as the gift shop, rental hall, and both exhibits, was filled with 5.5 feet of standing water. This catastrophic natural disaster caused significant damage to the building and at least half of the Museum's artifacts, necessitating $1.3 million in repairs.

On January 17, 2009, the AAMI was reopened to the public, featuring building renovations and repairs as well as a new temporary exhibit: No Roads Lead to Buxton. A new permanent exhibit, Endless Possibilities, was opened on December 15, 2009 and uses Photograph|photos, objects, stories, and multimedia to trace the journeys of Iowa’s African Americans.

Collection & exhibits 
The AAMI's collection includes more than 2,000 artifacts, 70 linear feet of archives, and 200 oral histories. Additionally, the AAMI's Library holds more than 1,000 volumes on African and African American topics.

Exhibit galleries 
The AAMI has two exhibit galleries on site. The first of these contains Endless Possibilities, which was installed in 2009. This permanent exhibit traces Iowa’s African American heritage from its origins in Western Africa through Slavery, the American Civil War, the Underground Railroad, the Civil Rights Movement, and struggles and accomplishments today.

The second exhibit is housed in the Gale Sayers Changing Exhibit Gallery, which displays at least one new temporary exhibit each year. The 2017 temporary exhibit is If Objects Could Talk, which allows visitors to view part of the Museum’s collection and see how everyday objects turn into invaluable historic records. Each object, photograph, and document has a story to tell about Iowa’s history and the contributions African Americans have made to the state.

Previous exhibits in the Gale Sayers Changing Exhibit Gallery include:
Unconditional Loyalty: The Military Service of African Americans (December 18, 2010 - December 17, 2011)
Our Sister's Many Hats (May 14, 2010 - December 1, 2010)
No Roads Lead to Buxton (January 17, 2009 - May 2, 2010)
Spirits & Sequins (April 4, 2009 - Fall 2009)
Iowa Roots, Global Impact: The Life and Legacy of George Washington Carver (September 29, 2007 - June 2008)
Forgotten History: African Americans in Lee County, Iowa
Unsung Heroines
It's More Than Just a Game: African American Sports in Iowa

Traveling exhibits 
In addition to its exhibits on-site in Cedar Rapids, the AAMI offers several traveling exhibits that are available free of charge for use by schools, libraries, or businesses. These exhibits include:
Against All Odds: The Life of George Washington Carver
Unconditional Loyalty: The Military Service of African Americans
Riding the Freedom Train: The Underground Railroad in Iowa
The Only One
No Roads Lead to Buxton (in progress)
Am I Not a Man and a Brother?  Iowa’s Journey Through Civil Rights (in progress)
Unsung Heroines (in progress)
It's More Than Just a Game: African American Sports in Iowa (in progress)

Programming 
Following the Iowa Flood of 2008, the AAMI recognized the need to shift its primary focus from preserving African American history to playing a more active role in educating people about this history within the Cedar Rapids area and across Iowa.

With this revised focus in mind, the AAMI has developed numerous programs and partnerships that offer educational opportunities. These events include an annual summer camp hosted at the Museum for children grades 3-5, a variety of workshops with preschool-aged children around the area and across Iowa, and Journey to Freedom, an immersive interactive event that allows participants to experience what it was like to travel on Iowa's Underground Railroad. Additionally, the AAMI presents an annual African American Women's Leadership Conference that provides important networking opportunities as well as inspiration to more than 400 attendees each year.

See also
 List of museums focused on African Americans

References

External links
 African-Americans of Cedar Rapids, Iowa

African-American museums in Iowa
Museums in Cedar Rapids, Iowa
Ethnic museums in Iowa
History museums in Iowa
African Americans in Iowa